Massachusetts Hall is the oldest building on the campus of Bowdoin College, in Brunswick, Maine.  It was built 1798–1802, and has seen a number of uses during the school's long history.  The building was listed on the National Register of Historic Places in 1971.

Description and history
Massachusetts Hall is located at the northern end of the Bowdoin Campus, just south of Bath Street and east of Memorial Hall, home to the Pickard Theatre.  It is a three-story red-brick structure, with a hip roof and granite trim elements, and a 2-1/2 story ell extending to one side.  The main block measures , and is five bays wide, with a central entrance flanked by pilasters and topped by a half-round transom and cornice.  The building's third-floor windows are smaller, a typical Federal period feature.

Bowdoin College was chartered in 1794, and its leadership authorized construction of its first building in 1798.  Construction began that year, but was brought to a halt by a lack of funding.  The college trustees sold off land elsewhere in Maine to fund its completion, and it was dedicated in 1802.  At first, it housed both students and the family of the first president, Joseph McKeen.  In 1803 the president's quarters (roughly the eastern half of the first two floors) were converted into laboratory and lecture spaces on the first floor, and student rooms on the second.  This lecture space was used by Parker Cleaveland until 1859.  In 1872-73 the interior underwent a major alteration, converting the upper two floors into a single large hall, which was used to house a museum of artifacts related to Cleaveland.  This work was done under the direction of Boston architect Abel C. Martin.  In 1936-37 architect Felix A. Burton oversaw another major rehabilitation, which including restoration of the exterior to its original configuration, and the interior to its present state.

See also
Parker Cleaveland House
National Register of Historic Places listings in Cumberland County, Maine

References

External links

School buildings on the National Register of Historic Places in Maine
Historic American Buildings Survey in Maine
Bowdoin College
Buildings and structures in Brunswick, Maine
National Register of Historic Places in Cumberland County, Maine
Historic district contributing properties in Maine